Justice Hill (born November 14, 1997) is an American football running back. Justice Hill may also refer to:

Richard Hill (Pennsylvania politician), associate justice of the provincial Pennsylvania Supreme Court
John Hill (Texas politician), chief justice of the Texas Supreme Court
Harold N. Hill Jr., associate justice of the Supreme Court of Georgia
H. Warner Hill, associate justice of the Supreme Court of Georgia
John Hill (died 1408), English Member of Parliament and justice of the King's Bench
Joseph Morrison Hill, chief justice of the Arkansas Supreme Court
Matthew W. Hill, associate justice of the Washington Supreme Court
Sir Robert Hill of Shilston, justice of the Common Pleas from 1408 to 1423
Thomas Hill, Chief Justice of the Leeward Islands at Montserrat, c. 1822–c. 1825
William A. Hill (1864–1932), associate justice of the Colorado Supreme Court
William C. Hill, associate justice of the Vermont Supreme Court
William U. Hill, associate justice of the Wyoming Supreme Court